The 1973 World Judo Championships were the 8th edition of the Men's World Judo Championships, and were held in Lausanne, Switzerland from June 22–24, 1973.

Medal overview

Men

Medal table

References

World Championships
J
World Judo Championships
J